Acacia coriacea, commonly known as river jam, wirewood, desert oak, wiry wattle or dogwood, is a tree in the family Mimosoideae of family Fabaceae. Indigenous Australians know the plant as Gunandru.

Description

River jam grows to a height of about eight metres.  It usually has just one or two main trunks.  Like most Acacia species, it has phyllodes rather than true leaves.  These are thick and leathery, between twenty and thirty centimetres long, and narrow.  The flowers are yellow, and held in spherical clusters about five millimetres in diameter.  The pods are usually curled up, but are around twenty centimetres long when straightened.  They are greatly constricted between the seeds.
Indigenous Australians used the seeds of the plant as a food source.

Distribution
Acacia coriacea occurs throughout northern Australia, growing as a tall tree on the banks of rivers.  It can also occur as a spreading, low tree behind coastal dunes and on 'spinifex' plains.

Common name issues 

In some parts of A. coriacea'''s range the common name "desert oak" is prevalent, but throughout the larger part of that range this name is often applied to another tree, Allocasuarina decaisneana. 
 
The name "Dogwood" is used for numerous plant species in Australia and elsewhere, see Dogwood (disambiguation).

 Varieties 

There are three subspecies.
Acacia coriacea subsp. coriacea
Acacia coriacea subsp. pendens
Acacia coriacea subsp. sericophylla
	Acacia coriacea var. coriacea is a synonym for Acacia coriacea subsp. coriacea''.

See also
List of Acacia species

References

Notes

General references

External links 
 Acacia coriacea Photo

Flora of the Northern Territory
Acacias of Western Australia
Flora of Queensland
coriacea
Trees of Australia
Fabales of Australia
Drought-tolerant trees
Taxa named by Augustin Pyramus de Candolle
Plants described in 1825